During the 1981–82 English football season, Brighton & Hove Albion competed in the Football League First Division.

Season summary
Brighton achieved their highest-ever league finish of 13th. On 6 March 1982 the Seagulls also scored an impressive clean-sheet win at Anfield against the 1981-82 First Division Champions Liverpool 0-1 (the champions' final league loss of the season).

Kit
Brighton's kit was manufactured by Adidas and sponsored by British Caledonian.

Results
Brighton & Hove Albion's score comes first

Legend

First Division

FA Cup

League Cup

Squad

Transfers

In
  Steve Gatting -  Arsenal, July
  Tony Grealish -  Luton Town, July
  Sammy Nelson -  Arsenal, October
  Mickey Thomas -  Everton, January

Out
  Moshe Gariani -  Maccabi Netanya, June
  Brian Horton -  Luton Town, June
  Mark Lawrenson -  Liverpool, June
  Peter O'Sullivan -  Fulham, June
  John Phillips -  Charlton Athletic, June

References

Brighton & Hove Albion F.C. seasons
Brighton and Hove Albion